A list of orders, deliveries, and current and previous operators of the Airbus A300 .

Data of planes that are still in operation through February 2023.

References

Operators
Airbus A300